Gschaid may refer to:

Gschaid bei Birkfeld, a municipality in the district of Weiz in Styria, Austria.
Gschaid bei Weiz, a cadastral community of Naas, Austria
Gschaid, a locality in Altlengbach, Austria

See also
Gscheid Pass (disambiguation)
Gschaidt